Han Eui-kwon (born 30 June 1994) is a South Korean footballer who plays as a forward for Fagiano Okayama in J2 League.

Club career
Han was selected by Gyeongnam FC in the 2014 K League Draft. He moved to Daejeon Citizen in July 2015.

In 2021, he moved to Seoul E-Land FC.

After the 2021 season, as the contract with Seoul E-Land FC was over, he joined Fagiano Okayama of J2 League.

Honours

International
South Korea U-23
 King's Cup: 2015

References

External links 

1994 births
Living people
Association football forwards
South Korean footballers
Gyeongnam FC players
Daejeon Hana Citizen FC players
Asan Mugunghwa FC players
Suwon Samsung Bluewings players
Seoul E-Land FC players
Fagiano Okayama players
K League 2 players
K League 1 players
J2 League players
People from Gangneung